Timothy Foote (3 May 1926 - 21 December 2015) was a London-born American editor and writer.

Biography
He was educated at Friends Seminary in New York, and graduated from Harvard in 1949, Summa Cum Laude and a member of Phi Beta Kappa. During World War Two, he interrupted his education to work as a radio operator on an aircraft carrier in the Pacific.

He was the author of two books, The World of Bruegel (1968) and The Great Ringtail Garbage Caper (1980) and several hundred articles and reviews on a wide range of subjects, variously published in TIME, where he was a senior editor for 14 years, The New York Times Sunday Book Review, Washington Post Book World, Esquire, The American Scholar and Smithsonian Magazine. As his website  points out, his topics ranged from the Hungarian Revolution of 1956, France and the French (he was a Paris-based foreign correspondent for six years), W.H. Auden, Harvard, the decline of quality in publishing, Border Collies, Midway Island, Gibraltar, Hadrian's Wall.

His best-selling work is The World of Bruegel which deals with the life and work of Pieter Bruegel the elder, seen in the religious, artistic and historic context of 16th-century Europe, especially the Low Countries. The Great Ringtail Garbage Caper (1980) is a book for children of all ages. It tells of a group of raccoons who organize a hijacking plan when their regular food supply is put under threat by new, younger, more efficient garbage collectors.  This was turned into a cartoon with the help of Hanna-Barbera, but thus far has not yet made it to release on DVD/Video formats.

After retiring, Foote continued to write and was a contributor to The American Scholar.  In the Autumn 2005 edition Foote wrote about his reporting in Israel and Lourdes with LIFE photographer Alfred Eisenstaedt.

Foote died on 21 December 2015 in Beaverkill, New York. He had been suffering from mesothelioma.

Bibliography
 Foote, Timothy (1968), The World of Bruegel c1525-1569  ASIN: B000H3Q89C
 Foote, Timothy (1980), The Great Ringtail Garbage Caper

References

Writers from Washington, D.C.
American non-fiction writers
1926 births
2015 deaths
British emigrants to the United States
Harvard University alumni
Friends Seminary alumni